The Second cabinet of Jón Magnússon was formed 25 February 1920.

Cabinets

Inaugural cabinet

Change (20 January 1922)

See also 

1920 establishments in Iceland
1922 disestablishments in Iceland
Jon Magnusson, Second cabinet of
Cabinets established in 1920
Cabinets disestablished in 1922